Pasadena is an inner southern suburb of Adelaide, South Australia in the City of Mitcham.

History
Panorama Post Office opened on 1 August 1947 and was renamed Pasadena in 1982.

Facilities
 Centennial Park Cemetery
 Naomi Reserve
 Springbank Secondary College, former known as Daws Road High School (1964–2001) and Pasadena High School (2001–2019)
 Saddie Hill Reserve
 Pasadena Shopping Centre and Foodland, formerly Big Crow Supermarket. The original 1970s shopping centre featured a Woolworths supermarket and specialty stores. In 2011 the centre underwent redevelopment and renaming to Pasadena Green Shopping Centre.  The redevelopment includes a new church facility for Southland Vineyard Church, a new Dan Murphy's store, and a new Urban by Target department store, which was replaced by TK Maxx in 2020.
 Air-Stream Community Wireless Access Point
 Trinity Lutheran Church (a member of the Lutheran Church of Australia), and Trinity Place (Pasadena Lutheran Aged Care Environs), its aged care facility

References

Suburbs of Adelaide